Centrosomal protein of 164 kDa, also known as CEP164, is a protein that in humans is encoded by the CEP164 gene.
Its function appears two be twofold: CEP164 is required for primary cilium formation. Furthermore, it is an important component in the response to DNA damage by UV light.

References

External links

Further reading

Centrosome